is the 46th head of the Nanbu clan from Morioka Domain, descendant of Emperor Go-Yōzei, and statutory auditor of the Tohoku Bank.

He is CEO of the Orix Ceramic Limited Company yūgen gaisha established by his grandfather, a director of Iwate Nippon Keidanren, and President of the Iwate Scout Council, and also serves in a key position of various groups within Iwate prefecture.

Ancestry

References

External links

Scouting in Japan
1970 births
Living people
Toshifumi